Nicos Nicolaides (born 2 November 1953) is a Greek Cypriot politician. He is currently the Mayor of Limassol. From May 2011 to December 2016, he was a Member of Parliament in the House of Representatives of Cyprus, representing the Limassol constituency under the banner of social democratic party EDEK.

Personal life
Nicolaides was born in Limassol in 1953. He studied electrical engineering at Dartmouth College and the University of Southern California, earning a master's degree.

Nicolaides is married to Elena Ioannou and has two children and a grandson. He speaks English and French fluently.

Political career
Nicolaides was Minister of Communications and Works in the Christofias cabinet between 2008 and 2010. Previously, he served as chairman of the board of the Licensing Authority (2006–2008), as president of the EDEK Limassol District committee (2003–2008) and as a member of the EDEK political bureau and central committee.

In parliament, Nicolaides served as a member of the Agriculture and Natural Resources, Communications and Works, Finance and Budget, and Legal Affairs committees.

Nicolaides was elected as the Mayor of Limassol in December 2016. He was supported by the ruling DISY, the Green party, the Solidarity Movement and Limassol Architects Movement. Nicolaides won Limassol with 48,31% of the vote, only marginally ahead of two-term incumbent Andreas Christou at 48,27%.

References

1953 births
Living people
Members of the House of Representatives (Cyprus)
People from Limassol
Greek Cypriot people
University of Southern California alumni
Movement for Social Democracy politicians
Nicolaides Nicos
Mayors of Limassol